Ixtle, also known by the trade name Tampico fiber, is a stiff plant fiber obtained from a number of Mexican plants, chiefly species of Agave and Yucca. The principal source is Agave lechuguilla, the dominant Agave species in the Chihuahuan Desert. Ixtle is  the common name (or part of the common name) of the plants producing the fiber. Ixtle is also the common name of a species of bromeliad, Aechmea magdalenae, grown in southern Mexico for its silky fibers.

Ixtle fiber is used as a substitute for animal bristles in the manufacture of brushes, cords, and lariats. Wrapped with thread, parallel bundles of fiber were used as the boning in corsets.

Types
Particular kinds of Ixtle include:

Tula Ixtle, produced from Agave lechuguilla or Agave univittata. The name is derived from the town of Tula, also in the Mexican state of Tamaulipas.
Jaumave Ixtle, produced from Agave funkiana (syn. A. lophantha), is said to be the best grade. The name comes from the  Jaumave Valley in the Mexican state of Tamaulipas, where it is grown. The fiber is obtained from the young inner leaves that form the central bud.
Palma Ixtle, produced from the young leaves of species of Yucca, known as palmas in Spanish. The main species used is Yucca carnerosana (syn. Samuela carnerosana), although Yucca treculeana is also used. The fiber is more difficult to extract from yuccas than from agaves, requiring the leaves to be steamed first for two to four hours. The fiber is described as "somewhat gummy".

References

External links
Fiber processing
Description with more pictures

Fiber plants